Or Kahlon (born 2 February 1988) is an Israeli dancer.

Biography
Or Kahlon was born in the city of Givat Olga in Israel. He grew up in the Hasharon neighborhood in Givat Olga. Or Kahlon started dancing at the age of fourteen. He graduated from Thelma Yellin High School of Arts in 2005. Kahlon received a scholarship and participated in summer training programs at Juilliard School in New York City. Kahlon studied with Jiří Kylián, Nacho Duato and William Forsythe. Kahlon won the first Israeli Born to Dance competition in 2006.

Dancing career
Kahlon danced with Spanish National Dance Company from 2007 till 2009. He was leading dancer of Nederlands Dans Theater from 2009 till 2011.

References

Israeli male dancers
Thelma Yellin High School of Arts alumni
Reality dancing competition winners
1988 births
Living people